This is a list of the bird species recorded in French Guiana. The avifauna of French Guiana has 698 confirmed species, of which one is endemic. Two have been introduced by humans and 58 are rare or vagrants. An additional 28 species are hypothetical and one is uncertain (see below).

Except as an entry is cited otherwise, the list of species is that of the South American Classification Committee (SACC) of the American Ornithological Society. The list's taxonomic treatment (designation and sequence of orders, families, and species) and nomenclature (common and scientific names) are also those of the SACC.

The following tags have been used to highlight certain categories of occurrence.

 (V) Vagrant - a species that rarely or accidentally occurs in French Guiana
 (E) Endemic - a species endemic to French Guiana
 (I) Introduced - a species introduced to French Guiana as a consequence, direct or indirect, of human actions
 (H) Hypothetical - a species recorded but with "no tangible evidence" according to the SACC
 (?) Uncertain - a species whose presence is suspected but not confirmed according to the SACC

Tinamous
Order: TinamiformesFamily: Tinamidae

The tinamous are one of the most ancient groups of bird. Although they look similar to other ground-dwelling birds like quail and grouse, they have no close relatives and are classified as a single family, Tinamidae, within their own order, the Tinamiformes. They are distantly related to the ratites (order Struthioniformes), that includes the rheas, emus, and kiwis. Seven species have been recorded in French Guiana.

Great tinamou, Tinamus major
Cinereous tinamou, Crypturellus cinereus
Little tinamou, Crypturellus soui
Variegated tinamou, Crypturellus variegatus
Rusty tinamou, Crypturellus brevirostris

Screamers
Order: AnseriformesFamily: Anhimidae

The screamers are a small family of birds related to the ducks. They are large, bulky birds, with a small downy head, long legs, and large feet which are only partially webbed. They have large spurs on their wings which are used in fights over mates and in territorial disputes. One species has been recorded in French Guiana.

Horned screamer, Anhima cornuta (V)

Ducks
Order: AnseriformesFamily: Anatidae

Anatidae includes the ducks and most duck-like waterfowl, such as geese and swans. These birds are adapted to an aquatic existence with webbed feet, flattened bills, and feathers that are excellent at shedding water due to an oily coating. Fourteen species have been recorded in French Guiana.

Fulvous whistling-duck, Dendrocygna bicolor
White-faced whistling-duck, Dendrocygna viduata (V)
Black-bellied whistling-duck, Dendrocygna autumnalis
Muscovy duck, Cairina moschata
Comb duck, Sarkidiornis sylvicola (V)
Northern shoveler, Spatula clypeata (V)
Blue-winged teal, Spatula discors
American wigeon, Mareca americana (V)
White-cheeked pintail, Anas bahamensis
Northern pintail, Anas acuta (V)
Green-winged teal, Anas crecca (V)
Ring-necked duck, Aythya collaris (V)
Lesser scaup, Aythya affinis (V)
Masked duck, Nomonyx dominicus

Guans
Order: GalliformesFamily: Cracidae

The Cracidae are large birds, similar in general appearance to turkeys. The guans and curassows live in trees, but the smaller chachalacas are found in more open scrubby habitats. They are generally dull-plumaged, but the curassows and some guans have colorful facial ornaments. Four species have been recorded in French Guiana.

Marail guan, Penelope marail
Blue-throated piping-guan, Pipile cumanensis
Variable chachalaca, Ortalis motmot
Black curassow, Crax alector

New World quails
Order: GalliformesFamily: Odontophoridae

The New World quails are small, plump terrestrial birds only distantly related to the quails of the Old World, but named for their similar appearance and habits. Two species have been recorded in French Guiana.

Crested bobwhite, Colinus cristatus (H)
Marbled wood-quail, Odontophorus gujanensis

Flamingos
Order: PhoenicopteriformesFamily: Phoenicopteridae

Flamingos filter-feed on shellfish and algae. Their oddly shaped beaks are specially adapted to separate mud and silt from the food they consume and, uniquely, are used upside-down. One species has been recorded in French Guiana.

American flamingo, Phoenicopterus ruber

Grebes
Order: PodicipediformesFamily: Podicipedidae

Grebes are small to medium-large freshwater diving birds. They have lobed toes and are excellent swimmers and divers. However, they have their feet placed far back on the body, making them quite ungainly on land. Two species have been recorded in French Guiana.

Least grebe, Tachybaptus dominicus
Pied-billed grebe, Podilymbus podiceps

Pigeons
Order: ColumbiformesFamily: Columbidae

Pigeons and doves are stout-bodied birds with short necks and short slender bills with a fleshy cere. Thirteen species have been recorded in French Guiana.

Rock pigeon, Columba livia (I)
Scaled pigeon, Patagioenas speciosa
Pale-vented pigeon, Patagioenas cayennensis
Plumbeous pigeon, Patagioenas plumbea
Ruddy pigeon, Patagioenas subvinacea
Ruddy quail-dove, Geotrygon montana
White-tipped dove, Leptotila verreauxi
Gray-fronted dove, Leptotila rufaxilla
Eared dove, Zenaida auriculata
Blue ground dove, Claravis pretiosa
Common ground dove, Columbina passerina
Plain-breasted ground dove, Columbina minuta
Ruddy ground dove, Columbina talpacoti

Cuckoos
Order: CuculiformesFamily: Cuculidae

The family Cuculidae includes cuckoos, roadrunners, and anis. These birds are of variable size with slender bodies, long tails and strong legs. Eleven species have been recorded in French Guiana.

Greater ani, Crotophaga major
Smooth-billed ani, Crotophaga ani
Striped cuckoo, Tapera naevia
Pavonine cuckoo, Dromococcyx pavoninus
Little cuckoo, Coccycua  minuta
Squirrel cuckoo, Piaya cayana
Black-bellied cuckoo, Piaya melanogaster
Dark-billed cuckoo, Coccyzus melacoryphus
Yellow-billed cuckoo, Coccyzus americanus
Pearly-breasted cuckoo, Coccyzus euleri
Mangrove cuckoo, Coccyzus minor

Oilbird
Order: SteatornithiformesFamily: Steatornithidae

The oilbird is a slim, long-winged bird related to the nightjars. It is nocturnal and a specialist feeder on the fruit of the oil palm.

Oilbird, Steatornis caripensis

Potoos
Order: NyctibiiformesFamily: Nyctibiidae

The potoos (sometimes called poor-me-ones) are large near passerine birds related to the nightjars and frogmouths. They are nocturnal insectivores which lack the bristles around the mouth found in the true nightjars. Five species have been recorded in French Guiana.

Rufous potoo, Phyllaemulor bracteatus
Great potoo, Nyctibius grandis
Long-tailed potoo, Nyctibius aethereus
Common potoo, Nyctibius griseus
White-winged potoo, Nyctibius leucopterus

Nightjars
Order: CaprimulgiformesFamily: Caprimulgidae

Nightjars are medium-sized nocturnal birds that usually nest on the ground. They have long wings, short legs and very short bills. Most have small feet, of little use for walking, and long pointed wings. Their soft plumage is camouflaged to resemble bark or leaves. Ten species have been recorded in French Guiana.

Nacunda nighthawk, Chordeiles nacunda
Lesser nighthawk, Chordeiles acutipennis
Short-tailed nighthawk, Lurocalis semitorquatus
Band-tailed nighthawk, Nyctiprogne leucopyga
Blackish nightjar, Nyctipolus nigrescens
Common pauraque, Nyctidromus albicollis
Cayenne nightjar, Setopagis maculosa (E)
White-tailed nightjar, Hydropsalis cayennensis
Spot-tailed nightjar, Hydropsalis maculicaudus
Ladder-tailed nightjar, Hydropsalis climacocerca

Swifts
Order: ApodiformesFamily: Apodidae

Swifts are small birds which spend the majority of their lives flying. These birds have very short legs and never settle voluntarily on the ground, perching instead only on vertical surfaces. Many swifts have long swept-back wings which resemble a crescent or boomerang. Ten species have been recorded in French Guiana.

White-chinned swift, Cypseloides cryptus (V)
Black swift, Cypseloides niger (V)
White-collared swift, Streptoprocne zonaris
Band-rumped swift, Chaetura spinicaudus
Chapman's swift, Chaetura chapmani
Sick's swift, Chaetura meridionalis (V)
Short-tailed swift, Chaetura brachyura
White-tipped swift, Aeronautes montivagus
Fork-tailed palm-swift, Tachornis squamata
Lesser swallow-tailed swift, Panyptila cayennensis

Hummingbirds
Order: ApodiformesFamily: Trochilidae

Hummingbirds are small birds capable of hovering in mid-air due to the rapid flapping of their wings. They are the only birds that can fly backwards. Thirty-two species have been recorded in French Guiana.

Crimson topaz, Topaza pella
White-necked jacobin, Florisuga mellivora
Rufous-breasted hermit, Glaucis hirsutus
Sooty barbthroat, Threnetes niger
Little hermit, Phaethornis longuemareus
Reddish hermit, Phaethornis ruber
Sooty-capped hermit, Phaethornis augusti
Straight-billed hermit, Phaethornis bourcieri
Long-tailed hermit, Phaethornis superciliosus
Great-billed hermit, Phaethornis malaris
Brown violetear, Colibri delphinae
Black-eared fairy, Heliothryx auritus
White-tailed goldenthroat, Polytmus guainumbi
Green-tailed goldenthroat, Polytmus theresiae
Fiery-tailed awlbill, Avocettula recurvirostris
Ruby-topaz hummingbird, Chrysolampis mosquitus
Green-throated mango, Anthracothorax viridigula
Black-throated mango, Anthracothorax nigricollis
Racket-tailed thorntail, Discosura longicaudus
Tufted coquette, Lophornis ornatus
Long-billed starthroat, Heliomaster longirostris (H)
Amethyst woodstar, Calliphlox amethystina
Blue-tailed emerald, Chlorostilbon mellisugus
Blue-chinned sapphire, Chlorestes notata
Gray-breasted sabrewing, Campylopterus largipennis
Fork-tailed woodnymph, Thalurania furcata
Plain-bellied emerald, Chrysuronia leucogaster
White-chested emerald, Chrysuronia brevirostris
Glittering-throated emerald, Chionomesa fimbriata
Green-bellied hummingbird, Saucerottia viridigaster (V)
Rufous-throated sapphire, Hylocharis sapphirina
White-chinned sapphire, Chlorestes cyanus

Hoatzin
Order: OpisthocomiformesFamily: Opisthocomidae

The Hoatzin is pheasant-sized, but much slimmer. It has a long tail and neck, but a small head with an unfeathered blue face and red eyes which are topped by a spiky crest. It is a weak flier which is found in the swamps of the Amazon and Orinoco rivers.

Hoatzin, Opisthocomus hoazin

Limpkin
Order: GruiformesFamily: Aramidae

The limpkin resembles a large rail. It has drab-brown plumage and a grayer head and neck.

Limpkin, Aramus guarauna

Trumpeters
Order: GruiformesFamily: Psophiidae

The trumpeters are dumpy birds with long necks and legs and chicken-like bills. They are named for the trumpeting call of the males. One species has been recorded in French Guiana.

Gray-winged trumpeter, Psophia crepitans

Rails
Order: GruiformesFamily: Rallidae

Rallidae is a large family of small to medium-sized birds which includes the rails, crakes, coots, and gallinules. Typically they inhabit dense vegetation in damp environments near lakes, swamps, or rivers. In general they are shy and secretive birds, making them difficult to observe. Most species have strong legs and long toes which are well adapted to soft uneven surfaces. They tend to have short, rounded wings and to be weak fliers. Sixteen species have been recorded in French Guiana.

Mangrove rail, Rallus longirostris
Purple gallinule, Porphyrio martinica
Azure gallinule, Porphyrio flavirostris
Russet-crowned crake, Anurolimnas viridis
Rufous-sided crake, Laterallus melanophaius
Gray-breasted crake, Laterallus exilis
Ocellated crake, Micropygia schomburgkii
Ash-throated crake, Mustelirallus albicollis
Paint-billed crake, Mustelirallus erythrops
Spotted rail, Pardirallus maculatus
Little wood-rail, Aramides mangle (V)
Gray-cowled wood-rail, Aramides cajaneus
Rufous-necked wood-rail, Aramides axillaris
Uniform crake, Amaurolimnas concolor
Yellow-breasted crake, Hapalocrex flaviventer
Common gallinule, Gallinula galeata

Finfoots
Order: GruiformesFamily: Heliornithidae

Heliornithidae is a small family of tropical birds with webbed lobes on their feet similar to those of grebes and coots. One species has been recorded in French Guiana.

Sungrebe, Heliornis fulica

Plovers
Order: CharadriiformesFamily: Charadriidae

The family Charadriidae includes the plovers, dotterels, and lapwings. They are small to medium-sized birds with compact bodies, short, thick necks, and long, usually pointed, wings. They are found in open country worldwide, mostly in habitats near water. Eight species have been recorded in French Guiana.

American golden-plover, Pluvialis dominica
Black-bellied plover, Pluvialis squatarola
Pied lapwing, Vanellus cayanus
Southern lapwing, Vanellus chilensis (V)
Killdeer, Charadrius vociferus (H)
Semipalmated plover, Charadrius semipalmatus
Wilson's plover, Charadrius wilsonia
Collared plover, Charadrius collaris

Oystercatchers
Order: CharadriiformesFamily: Haematopodidae

The oystercatchers are large and noisy plover-like birds, with strong bills used for smashing or prising open molluscs. One species has been recorded in French Guiana.

American oystercatcher, Haematopus palliatus (H)

Avocets and stilts
Order: CharadriiformesFamily: Recurvirostridae

Recurvirostridae is a family of large wading birds, which includes the avocets and stilts. The avocets have long legs and long up-curved bills. The stilts have extremely long legs and long, thin, straight bills. One species has been recorded in French Guiana.

Black-necked stilt, Himantopus mexicanus

Sandpipers
Order: CharadriiformesFamily: Scolopacidae

Scolopacidae is a large diverse family of small to medium-sized shorebirds including the sandpipers, curlews, godwits, shanks, tattlers, woodcocks, snipes, dowitchers, and phalaropes. The majority of these species eat small invertebrates picked out of the mud or soil. Variation in length of legs and bills enables multiple species to feed in the same habitat, particularly on the coast, without direct competition for food. Twenty-eight species have been recorded in French Guiana.

Upland sandpiper, Bartramia longicauda
Whimbrel, Numenius phaeopus
Bar-tailed godwit, Limosa lapponica (V)
Hudsonian godwit, Limosa haemastica
Ruddy turnstone, Arenaria interpres
Red knot, Calidris canutus
Ruff, Calidris pugnax (V)
Stilt sandpiper, Calidris himantopus
Curlew sandpiper, Calidris ferruginea (H)
Sanderling, Calidris alba
Dunlin, Calidris alpina (V)
Least sandpiper, Calidris minutilla
White-rumped sandpiper, Calidris fuscicollis
Buff-breasted sandpiper, Calidris subruficollis
Pectoral sandpiper, Calidris melanotos
Semipalmated sandpiper, Calidris pusilla
Western sandpiper, Calidris mauri
Short-billed dowitcher, Limnodromus griseus
Long-billed dowitcher, Limnodromus scolopaceus (V)
Giant snipe, Gallinago undulata
Pantanal snipe, Gallinago paraguaiae
Terek sandpiper, Xenus cinereus (V)
Spotted sandpiper, Actitis macularia
Solitary sandpiper, Tringa solitaria
Common greenshank, Tringa nebularia (V)
Greater yellowlegs, Tringa melanoleuca
Willet, Tringa semipalmata
Lesser yellowlegs, Tringa flavipes

Jacanas
Order: CharadriiformesFamily: Jacanidae

The jacanas are a family of waders found throughout the tropics. They are identifiable by their huge feet and claws which enable them to walk on floating vegetation in the shallow lakes that are their preferred habitat. One species has been recorded in French Guiana.

Wattled jacana, Jacana jacana

Skuas
Order: CharadriiformesFamily: Stercorariidae

The family Stercorariidae are, in general, medium to large birds, typically with gray or brown plumage, often with white markings on the wings. They nest on the ground in temperate and arctic regions and are long-distance migrants. Five species have been recorded in French Guiana.

Great skua, Stercorarius skua
South polar skua, Stercorarius maccormicki
Pomarine jaeger, Stercorarius pomarinus
Parasitic jaeger, Stercorarius parasiticus
Long-tailed jaeger, Stercorarius longicaudus

Skimmers
Order: CharadriiformesFamily: Rynchopidae

Skimmers are a small family of tropical tern-like birds. They have an elongated lower mandible which they use to feed by flying low over the water surface and skimming the water for small fish. One species has been recorded in French Guiana.

Black skimmer, Rynchops niger

Gulls
Order: CharadriiformesFamily: Laridae

Laridae is a family of medium to large seabirds and includes gulls, kittiwakes, terns, and skimmers. Gulls are typically gray or white, often with black markings on the head or wings. They have longish bills and webbed feet. Terns are a group of generally medium to large seabirds typically with gray or white plumage, often with black markings on the head. Most terns hunt fish by diving but some pick insects off the surface of fresh water. Terns are generally long-lived birds, with several species known to live in excess 30 years. Twenty-seven species of Laridae have been recorded in French Guiana.

Black-legged kittiwake, Rissa tridactyla (H)
Sabine's gull, Xema sabini (V)
Gray-hooded gull, Chroicocephalus cirrocephalus (V)
Black-headed gull, Chroicocephalus ridibundus (V)
Little gull, Hydrocoloeus minutus (V)
Laughing gull, Leucophaeus atricilla
Franklin's gull, Leucophaeus pipixcan (V)
Great black-backed gull, Larus marinus (V)
Kelp gull, Larus dominicanus (V)
Lesser black-backed gull, Larus fuscus (V)
Herring gull, Larus argentatus (V)
Brown noddy, Anous stolidus
Sooty tern, Onychoprion fuscata
Bridled tern, Onychoprion anaethetus (V)
Least tern, Sterula antillarum
Yellow-billed tern, Sternula superciliaris
Large-billed tern, Phaetusa simplex
Gull-billed tern, Gelochelidon nilotica
Black tern, Chlidonias niger
White-winged tern, Chlidonias leucopterus (V)
Common tern, Sterna hirundo
Roseate tern, Sterna dougallii
Arctic tern, Sterna paradisaea
Elegant tern, Thalasseus elegans (V)
Sandwich tern, Thalasseus sandvicensis
Royal tern, Thalasseus maximus

Sunbittern
Order: EurypygiformesFamily: Eurypygidae

The sunbittern is a bittern-like bird of tropical regions of the Americas and the sole member of the family Eurypygidae (sometimes spelled Eurypigidae) and genus Eurypyga.

Sunbittern, Eurypyga helias

Tropicbirds
Order: PhaethontiformesFamily: Phaethontidae

Tropicbirds are slender white birds of tropical oceans, with exceptionally long central tail feathers. Their heads and long wings have black markings. One species has been recorded in French Guiana.

Red-billed tropicbird, Phaethon aethereus

Albatrosses
Order: ProcellariiformesFamily: Diomedeidae

The albatrosses are among the largest of flying birds, and the great albatrosses from the genus Diomedea have the largest wingspans of any extant birds. One species has been recorded in French Guiana.

Yellow-nosed albatross, Thalassarche chlororhynchos (V)

Southern storm-petrels
Order: ProcellariiformesFamily: Oceanitidae

The storm-petrels are the smallest seabirds, relatives of the petrels, feeding on planktonic crustaceans and small fish picked from the surface, typically while hovering. The flight is fluttering and sometimes bat-like. Until 2018, this family's species were included with the other storm-petrels in family Hydrobatidae. One species has been recorded in French Guiana.

Wilson's storm-petrel, Oceanites oceanicus

Northern storm-petrels
Order: ProcellariiformesFamily: Hydrobatidae

Though the members of this family are similar in many respects to the southern storm-petrels, including their general appearance and habits, there are enough genetic differences to warrant their placement in a separate family. Two species have been recorded in French Guiana.

Band-rumped storm-petrel, Hydrobates castro (V)
Leach's storm-petrel, Hydrobates leucorhoa

Shearwaters
Order: ProcellariiformesFamily: Procellariidae

The procellariids are the main group of medium-sized "true petrels", characterized by united nostrils with medium septum and a long outer functional primary. Seven species have been recorded in French Guiana.

Fea's petrel, Pterodroma feae (V)
Bulwer's petrel, Bulweria bulwerii (H)
Cory's shearwater, Calonectris diomedea
Sooty shearwater, Ardenna grisea (V)
Great shearwater, Ardenna gravis
Manx shearwater, Puffinus puffinus
Audubon's shearwater, Puffinus lherminieri

Storks
Order: CiconiiformesFamily: Ciconiidae

Storks are large, long-legged, long-necked, wading birds with long, stout bills. Storks are mute, but bill-clattering is an important mode of communication at the nest. Their nests can be large and may be reused for many years. Many species are migratory. Three species have been recorded in French Guiana.

Maguari stork, Ciconia maguari (V)
Jabiru, Jabiru mycteria (V)
Wood stork, Mycteria americana

Frigatebirds
Order: SuliformesFamily: Fregatidae

Frigatebirds are large seabirds usually found over tropical oceans. They are large, black-and-white or completely black, with long wings and deeply forked tails. The males have colored inflatable throat pouches. They do not swim or walk and cannot take off from a flat surface. Having the largest wingspan-to-body-weight ratio of any bird, they are essentially aerial, able to stay aloft for more than a week. One species has been recorded in French Guiana.

Magnificent frigatebird, Fregata magnificens

Boobies
Order: SuliformesFamily: Sulidae

The sulids comprise the gannets and boobies. Both groups are medium to large coastal seabirds that plunge-dive for fish. Three species have been recorded in French Guiana.

Masked booby, Sula dactylatra
Red-footed booby, Sula sula (V)
Brown booby, Sula leucogaster

Anhingas
Order: SuliformesFamily: Anhingidae

Anhingas are often called "snake-birds" because of their long thin neck, which gives a snake-like appearance when they swim with their bodies submerged. The males have black and dark-brown plumage, an erectile crest on the nape, and a larger bill than the female. The females have much paler plumage especially on the neck and underparts. The darters have completely webbed feet and their legs are short and set far back on the body. Their plumage is somewhat permeable, like that of cormorants, and they spread their wings to dry after diving. One species has been recorded in French Guiana.

Anhinga, Anhinga anhinga

Cormorants
Order: SuliformesFamily: Phalacrocoracidae

Phalacrocoracidae is a family of medium to large coastal, fish-eating seabirds that includes cormorants and shags. Plumage coloration varies, with the majority having mainly dark plumage, some species being black-and-white, and a few being colorful. One species has been recorded in French Guiana.

Neotropic cormorant, Phalacrocorax brasilianus

Pelicans
Order: PelecaniformesFamily: Pelecanidae

Pelicans are large water birds with a distinctive pouch under their beak. As with other members of the order Pelecaniformes, they have webbed feet with four toes. One species has been recorded in French Guiana.

Brown pelican, Pelecanus occidentalis

Herons
Order: PelecaniformesFamily: Ardeidae

The family Ardeidae contains the bitterns, herons, and egrets. Herons and egrets are medium to large wading birds with long necks and legs. Bitterns tend to be shorter necked and more wary. Members of Ardeidae fly with their necks retracted, unlike other long-necked birds such as storks, ibises and spoonbills. Nineteen species have been recorded in French Guiana.

Rufescent tiger-heron, Tigrisoma lineatum
Fasciated tiger-heron, Tigrisoma fasciatum
Agami heron, Agamia agami
Boat-billed heron, Cochlearius cochlearius
Zigzag heron, Zebrilus undulatus
Pinnated bittern, Botaurus pinnatus
Least bittern, Ixobrychus exilis
Stripe-backed bittern, Ixobrychus involucris (H)
Black-crowned night-heron, Nycticorax nycticorax
Yellow-crowned night-heron, Nyctanassa violacea
Striated heron, Butorides striata
Cattle egret, Bubulcus ibis
Cocoi heron, Ardea cocoi
Great egret, Ardea alba
Capped heron, Pilherodius pileatus
Tricolored heron, Egretta tricolor
Little egret, Egretta garzetta (V)
Snowy egret, Egretta thula
Little blue heron, Egretta caerulea

Ibises
Order: PelecaniformesFamily: Threskiornithidae

Threskiornithidae is a family of large terrestrial and wading birds which includes the ibises and spoonbills. They have long, broad wings with 11 primary and about 20 secondary feathers. They are strong fliers and despite their size and weight, very capable soarers. Four species have been recorded in French Guiana.

White ibis, Eudocimus albus (V)
Scarlet ibis, Eudocimus ruber
Green ibis, Mesembrinibis cayennensis
Roseate spoonbill, Platalea ajaja

New World vultures
Order: CathartiformesFamily: Cathartidae

The New World vultures are not closely related to Old World vultures, but superficially resemble them because of convergent evolution. Like the Old World vultures, they are scavengers. However, unlike Old World vultures, which find carcasses by sight, New World vultures have a good sense of smell with which they locate carrion. Five species have been recorded in French Guiana.

King vulture, Sarcoramphus papa
Black vulture, Coragyps atratus
Turkey vulture, Cathartes aura
Lesser yellow-headed vulture, Cathartes burrovianus
Greater yellow-headed vulture, Cathartes melambrotus

Osprey
Order: AccipitriformesFamily: Pandionidae

The family Pandionidae contains only one species, the osprey. The osprey is a medium-large raptor which is a specialist fish-eater with a worldwide distribution.

Osprey, Pandion haliaetus

Hawks
Order: AccipitriformesFamily: Accipitridae

Accipitridae is a family of birds of prey, which includes hawks, eagles, kites, harriers, and Old World vultures. These birds have powerful hooked beaks for tearing flesh from their prey, strong legs, powerful talons, and keen eyesight. Thirty-three species have been recorded in French Guiana.

Pearl kite, Gampsonyx swainsonii (V)
White-tailed kite, Elanus leucurus
Hook-billed kite, Chondrohierax uncinatus
Gray-headed kite, Leptodon cayanensis
Swallow-tailed kite, Elanoides forficatus
Crested eagle, Morphnus guianensis
Harpy eagle, Harpia harpyja
Black hawk-eagle, Spizaetus tyrannus
Black-and-white hawk-eagle, Spizaetus melanoleucus
Ornate hawk-eagle, Spizaetus ornatus
Black-collared hawk, Busarellus nigricollis
Snail kite, Rostrhamus sociabilis
Slender-billed kite, Helicolestes hamatus
Double-toothed kite, Harpagus bidentatus
Rufous-thighed kite, Harpagus diodon (V)
Plumbeous kite, Ictinia plumbea
Long-winged harrier, Circus buffoni
Gray-bellied hawk, Accipiter poliogaster
Bicolored hawk, Accipiter bicolor
Tiny hawk, Microspizias superciliosus
Crane hawk, Geranospiza caerulescens
Slate-colored hawk, Buteogallus schistaceus
Rufous crab hawk, Buteogallus aequinoctialis
Savanna hawk, Buteogallus meridionalis
Great black hawk, Buteogallus urubitinga
Roadside hawk, Rupornis magnirostris
White-tailed hawk, Geranoaetus albicaudatus
White hawk, Pseudastur albicollis
Black-faced hawk, Leucopternis melanops
Gray-lined hawk, Buteo nitidus
Broad-winged hawk, Buteo platypterus
Short-tailed hawk, Buteo brachyurus
Zone-tailed hawk, Buteo albonotatus

Barn owls
Order: StrigiformesFamily: Tytonidae

Barn owls are medium to large owls with large heads and characteristic heart-shaped faces. They have long strong legs with powerful talons. One species has been recorded in French Guiana.

Barn owl, Tyto alba

Owls
Order: StrigiformesFamily: Strigidae

The typical owls are small to large solitary nocturnal birds of prey. They have large forward-facing eyes and ears, a hawk-like beak, and a conspicuous circle of feathers around each eye called a facial disk. Twelve species have been recorded in French Guiana.

Tropical screech-owl, Megascops choliba
Foothill screech-owl, Megascops roraimae
Tawny-bellied screech-owl, Megascops watsonii
Crested owl, Lophostrix cristata
Spectacled owl, Pulsatrix perspicillata
Great horned owl, Bubo virginianus
Mottled owl, Strix virgata
Black-banded owl, Strix huhula
Amazonian pygmy-owl, Glaucidium hardyi
Burrowing owl, Athene cunicularia
Striped owl, Asio clamator
Short-eared owl, Asio flammeus (H)

Trogons
Order: TrogoniformesFamily: Trogonidae

The family Trogonidae includes trogons and quetzals. Found in tropical woodlands worldwide, they feed on insects and fruit, and their broad bills and weak legs reflect their diet and arboreal habits. Although their flight is fast, they are reluctant to fly any distance. Trogons have soft, often colorful, feathers with distinctive male and female plumage. Five species have been recorded in French Guiana.

Black-tailed trogon, Trogon melanurus
Green-backed trogon, Trogon viridis
Guianan trogon, Trogon violaceus
Black-throated trogon, Trogon rufus (see note)
Collared trogon, Trogon collaris

Motmots
Order: CoraciiformesFamily: Momotidae

The motmots have colorful plumage and long, graduated tails which they display by waggling back and forth. In most of the species, the barbs near the ends of the two longest (central) tail feathers are weak and fall off, leaving a length of bare shaft and creating a racket-shaped tail. One species has been recorded in French Guiana.

Amazonian motmot, Momotus momota

Kingfishers
Order: CoraciiformesFamily: Alcedinidae

Kingfishers are medium-sized birds with large heads, long pointed bills, short legs, and stubby tails. Six species have been recorded in French Guiana.

Ringed kingfisher, Megaceryle torquatus
Belted kingfisher, Megaceryle alcyon (V)
Amazon kingfisher, Chloroceryle amazona
American pygmy kingfisher, Chloroceryle aenea
Green kingfisher, Chloroceryle americana
Green-and-rufous kingfisher, Chloroceryle inda

Jacamars
Order: GalbuliformesFamily: Galbulidae

The jacamars are near passerine birds from tropical South America, with a range that extends up to Mexico. They feed on insects caught on the wing, and are glossy, elegant birds with long bills and tails. In appearance and behavior they resemble the Old World bee-eaters, although they are more closely related to puffbirds. Six species have been recorded in French Guiana.

Brown jacamar, Brachygalba lugubris
Yellow-billed jacamar, Galbula albirostris
Green-tailed jacamar, Galbula galbula
Bronzy jacamar, Galbula leucogastra
Paradise jacamar, Galbula dea
Great jacamar, Jacamerops aureus

Puffbirds
Order: GalbuliformesFamily: Bucconidae

The puffbirds are related to the jacamars and have the same range, but lack the iridescent colors of that family. They are mainly brown, rufous, or gray, with large heads and flattened bills with hooked tips. The loose abundant plumage and short tails makes them look stout and puffy, giving rise to the English common name of the family. Eight species have been recorded in French Guiana.

Guianan puffbird, Notharchus macrorhynchos
Pied puffbird, Notharchus tectus
Spotted puffbird, Bucco tamatia
Collared puffbird, Bucco capensis
White-chested puffbird, Malacoptila fusca
Rusty-breasted nunlet, Nonnula rubecula (H)
Black nunbird, Monasa atra
Swallow-winged puffbird, Chelidoptera tenebrosa

New World barbets
Order: PiciformesFamily: Capitonidae

The barbets are plump birds, with short necks and large heads. They get their name from the bristles which fringe their heavy bills. Most species are brightly colored. One species has been recorded in French Guiana.

Black-spotted barbet, Capito niger

Toucans
Order: PiciformesFamily: Ramphastidae

Toucans are near passerine birds from the Neotropics. They are brightly marked and have enormous colorful bills which in some species amount to half their body length. Seven species have been recorded in French Guiana.

Toco toucan, Ramphastos toco
White-throated toucan, Ramphastos tucanus
Channel-billed toucan, Ramphastos vitellinus
Tepui toucanet, Aulacorhynchus whitelianus (H)
Guianan toucanet, Selenidera piperivora
Green aracari, Pteroglossus viridis
Black-necked aracari, Pteroglossus aracari

Woodpeckers
Order: PiciformesFamily: Picidae

Woodpeckers are small to medium-sized birds with chisel-like beaks, short legs, stiff tails, and long tongues used for capturing insects. Some species have feet with two toes pointing forward and two backward, while several species have only three toes. Many woodpeckers have the habit of tapping noisily on tree trunks with their beaks. Seventeen species have been recorded in French Guiana.

Golden-spangled piculet, Picumnus exilis
White-barred piculet, Picumnus cirratus
White woodpecker, Melanerpes candidus
Yellow-tufted woodpecker, Melanerpes cruentatus
Golden-collared woodpecker, Dryobates cassini
Little woodpecker, Dryobates passerinus
Red-necked woodpecker, Campephilus rubricollis
Crimson-crested woodpecker, Campephilus melanoleucos
Lineated woodpecker, Dryocopus lineatus
Ringed woodpecker, Celeus torquatus
Waved woodpecker, Celeus undatus
Cream-colored woodpecker, Celeus flavus
Chestnut woodpecker, Celeus elegans
Yellow-throated woodpecker, Piculus flavigula
Golden-green woodpecker, Piculus chrysochloros
Golden-olive woodpecker, Colaptes rubiginosus
Spot-breasted woodpecker, Colaptes punctigula

Falcons
Order: FalconiformesFamily: Falconidae

Falconidae is a family of diurnal birds of prey. They differ from hawks, eagles, and kites in that they kill with their beaks instead of their talons. Fifteen species have been recorded in French Guiana.

Laughing falcon, Herpetotheres cachinnans
Barred forest-falcon, Micrastur ruficollis
Lined forest-falcon, Micrastur gilvicollis
Slaty-backed forest-falcon, Micrastur mirandollei
Collared forest-falcon, Micrastur semitorquatus
Crested caracara, Caracara plancus
Red-throated caracara, Ibycter americanus
Black caracara, Daptrius ater
Yellow-headed caracara, Milvago chimachima
Eurasian kestrel, Falco tinnunculus (V)
Merlin, Falco columbarius
Bat falcon, Falco rufigularis
Orange-breasted falcon, Falco deiroleucus
Aplomado falcon, Falco femoralis
Peregrine falcon, Falco peregrinus

New World and African parrots
Order: PsittaciformesFamily: Psittacidae

Parrots are small to large birds with a characteristic curved beak. Their upper mandibles have slight mobility in the joint with the skull and they have a generally erect stance. All parrots are zygodactyl, having the four toes on each foot placed two at the front and two to the back. Twenty-four species have been recorded in French Guiana.

Lilac-tailed parrotlet, Touit batavicus
Sapphire-rumped parrotlet, Touit purpuratus
Canary-winged parakeet, Brotogeris versicolurus
Golden-winged parakeet, Brotogeris chrysoptera
Caica parrot, Pyrilia caica
Dusky parrot, Pionus fuscus
Blue-headed parrot, Pionus menstruus
Short-tailed parrot, Graydidascalus brachyurus
Blue-cheeked parrot, Amazona dufresniana
Mealy parrot, Amazona farinosa
Orange-winged parrot, Amazona amazonica
Dusky-billed parrotlet, Forpus modestus (H) — French Guiana's rarities committee (Le Comité d’Homologation de Guyane) has accepted two records of this species.
Green-rumped parrotlet, Forpus passerinus
Black-headed parrot, Pionites melanocephalus
Red-fan parrot, Deroptyus accipitrinus
Painted parakeet, Pyrrhura picta
Brown-throated parakeet, Eupsittula pertinax
Red-bellied macaw, Orthopsittaca manilatus
Blue-and-yellow macaw, Ara ararauna
Chestnut-fronted macaw, Ara severus
Scarlet macaw, Ara macao
Red-and-green macaw, Ara chloropterus
Red-shouldered macaw, Diopsittaca nobilis (V)
White-eyed parakeet, Psittacara leucophthalmus

Antbirds
Order: PasseriformesFamily: Thamnophilidae

The antbirds are a large family of small passerine birds of subtropical and tropical Central and South America. They are forest birds which tend to feed on insects at or near the ground. A sizable minority of them specialize in following columns of army ants to eat small invertebrates that leave their hiding places to flee from the ants. Many species lack bright color; brown, black, and white are the dominant tones. Forty-two species have been recorded in French Guiana.

Rufous-rumped antwren, Euchrepomis callinota
Ash-winged antwren, Euchrepomis spodioptila
Fasciated antshrike, Cymbilaimus lineatus
Black-throated antshrike, Frederickena viridis
Great antshrike, Taraba major
Black-crested antshrike, Sakesphorus canadensis
Barred antshrike, Thamnophilus doliatus
Mouse-colored antshrike, Thamnophilus murinus
Blackish-gray antshrike, Thamnophilus nigrocinereus
Northern slaty-antshrike, Thamnophilus punctatus
Band-tailed antshrike, Thamnophilus melanothorax
Amazonian antshrike, Thamnophilus amazonicus
Spot-tailed antwren, Herpsilochmus sticturus
Todd's antwren, Herpsilochmus stictocephalus
Dusky-throated antshrike, Thamnomanes ardesiacus
Cinereous antshrike, Thamnomanes caesius
Rufous-bellied antwren, Isleria guttata
Spot-winged antshrike, Pygiptila stellaris (H)
Brown-bellied stipplethroat, Epinecrophylla gutturalis
Pygmy antwren, Myrmotherula brachyura
Guianan streaked-antwren, Myrmotherula surinamensis
White-flanked antwren, Myrmotherula axillaris
Long-winged antwren, Myrmotherula longipennis
Gray antwren, Myrmotherula menetriesii
Dot-winged antwren, Microrhopias quixensis
White-fringed antwren, Formicivora grisea
Guianan warbling-antbird, Hypocnemis cantator
Dusky antbird, Cercomacroides tyrannina
Blackish antbird, Cercomacroides nigrescens
Gray antbird, Cercomacra cinerascens
White-browed antbird, Myrmoborus leucophrys
Black-chinned antbird, Hypocnemoides melanopogon
Silvered antbird, Sclateria naevia
Black-headed antbird, Percnostola rufifrons
Spot-winged antbird, Myrmelastes leucostigma
Ferruginous-backed antbird, Myrmoderus ferrugineus
Black-throated antbird, Myrmophylax atrothorax
Wing-banded antbird, Myrmornis torquata
White-plumed antbird, Pithys albifrons
Rufous-throated antbird, Gymnopithys rufigula
Spot-backed antbird, Hylophylax naevius
Common scale-backed antbird, Willisornis poecilinotus

Gnateaters
Order: PasseriformesFamily: Conopophagidae

The gnateaters are round, short-tailed, and long-legged birds, which are closely related to the antbirds. One species has been recorded in French Guiana.

Chestnut-belted gnateater, Conopophaga aurita

Antpittas
Order: PasseriformesFamily: Grallariidae

Antpittas resemble the true pittas with strong, longish legs, very short tails, and stout bills. Three species have been recorded in French Guiana.

Variegated antpitta, Grallaria varia
Spotted antpitta, Hylopezus macularius
Thrush-like antpitta, Myrmothera campanisona

Antthrushes
Order: PasseriformesFamily: Formicariidae

Antthrushes resemble small rails. Two species have been recorded in French Guiana.

Rufous-capped antthrush, Formicarius colma
Black-faced antthrush, Formicarius analis

Ovenbirds
Order: PasseriformesFamily: Furnariidae

Ovenbirds comprise a large family of small sub-oscine passerine bird species found in Central and South America. They are a diverse group of insectivores which gets its name from the elaborate "oven-like" clay nests built by some species, although others build stick nests or nest in tunnels or clefts in rock. The woodcreepers are brownish birds which maintain an upright vertical posture, supported by their stiff tail vanes. They feed mainly on insects taken from tree trunks. Thirty-six species have been recorded in French Guiana.

South American leaftosser, Sclerurus obscurior
Short-billed leaftosser, Sclerurus rufigularis
Black-tailed leaftosser, Sclerurus caudacutus
Spot-throated woodcreeper, Certhiasomus stictolaemus
Long-tailed woodcreeper, Deconychura longicauda
White-chinned woodcreeper, Dendrocincla merula
Plain-brown woodcreeper, Dendrocincla fuliginosa
Wedge-billed woodcreeper, Glyphorynchus spirurus
Cinnamon-throated woodcreeper, Dendrexetastes rufigula
Long-billed woodcreeper, Nasica longirostris
Amazonian barred-woodcreeper, Dendrocolaptes certhia
Black-banded woodcreeper, Dendrocolaptes picumnus
Red-billed woodcreeper, Hylexetastes perrotii
Striped woodcreeper, Xiphorhynchus obsoletus
Chestnut-rumped woodcreeper, Xiphorhynchus pardalotus
Buff-throated woodcreeper, Xiphorhynchus guttatus
Straight-billed woodcreeper, Dendroplex picus
Curve-billed scythebill, Campylorhamphus procurvoides
Guianan woodcreeper, Lepidocolaptes albolineatus
Slender-billed xenops, Xenops tenuirostris
Plain xenops, Xenops minutus
Point-tailed palmcreeper, Berlepschia rikeri
Rufous-tailed xenops, Microxenops milleri (H) — French Guiana's rarities committee (Le Comité d’Homologation de Guyane) has accepted two records of this species.
Rufous-rumped foliage-gleaner, Philydor erythrocercum
Cinnamon-rumped foliage-gleaner, Philydor pyrrhodes
Rufous-tailed foliage-gleaner, Anabacerthia ruficaudata (H)
Ruddy foliage-gleaner, Clibanornis rubiginosus
Chestnut-crowned foliage-gleaner, Automolus rufipileatus
Buff-throated foliage-gleaner, Automolus ochrolaemus
Olive-backed foliage-gleaner, Automolus infuscatus
Speckled spinetail, Cranioleuca gutturata
Yellow-chinned spinetail, Certhiaxis cinnamomeus
White-bellied spinetail, Mazaria propinqua
Plain-crowned spinetail, Synallaxis gujanensis
McConnell's spinetail, Synallaxis macconnelli
Pale-breasted spinetail, Synallaxis albescens

Manakins
Order: PasseriformesFamily: Pipridae

The manakins are a family of subtropical and tropical mainland Central and South America, and Trinidad and Tobago. They are compact forest birds, the males typically being brightly colored, although the females of most species are duller and usually green-plumaged. Manakins feed on small fruits, berries, and insects. Ten species have been recorded in French Guiana.

Tiny tyrant-manakin, Tyranneutes virescens
Saffron-crested tyrant-manakin, Neopelma chrysocephalum (V)
Blue-backed manakin, Chiroxiphia pareola
White-throated manakin, Corapipo gutturalis
Black manakin, Xenopipo atronitens
White-fronted manakin, Lepidothrix serena
White-bearded manakin, Manacus manacus
Crimson-hooded manakin, Pipra aureola
White-crowned manakin, Pseudopipra pipra
Golden-headed manakin, Ceratopipra erythrocephala

Cotingas
Order: PasseriformesFamily: Cotingidae

The cotingas are birds of forests or forest edges in tropical South America. Comparatively little is known about this diverse group, although all have broad bills with hooked tips, rounded wings, and strong legs. The males of many of the species are brightly colored or decorated with plumes or wattles. Eleven species have been recorded in French Guiana.

Guianan red-cotinga, Phoenicircus carnifex
Guianan cock-of-the-rock, Rupicola rupicola
Crimson fruitcrow, Haematoderus militaris
Purple-throated fruitcrow, Querula purpurata
Capuchinbird, Perissocephalus tricolor
Purple-breasted cotinga, Cotinga cotinga
Spangled cotinga, Cotinga cayana
Screaming piha, Lipaugus vociferans
White bellbird, Procnias alba
Pompadour cotinga, Xipholena punicea
Bare-necked fruitcrow, Gymnoderus foetidus

Tityras
Order: PasseriformesFamily: Tityridae

Tityridae are suboscine passerine birds found in forest and woodland in the Neotropics. The species in this family were formerly spread over the families Tyrannidae, Pipridae, and Cotingidae. They are small to medium-sized birds. They do not have the sophisticated vocal capabilities of the songbirds. Most, but not all, have plain coloring. Ten species have been recorded in French Guiana.

Black-crowned tityra, Tityra inquisitor
Black-tailed tityra, Tityra cayana
Olivaceous schiffornis, Schiffornis olivacea
Cinereous mourner, Laniocera hypopyrra
Dusky purpletuft, Iodopleura fusca
Cinereous becard, Pachyramphus rufus
White-winged becard, Pachyramphus polychopterus
Black-capped becard, Pachyramphus marginatus
Glossy-backed becard, Pachyramphus surinamus
Pink-throated becard, Pachyramphus minor

Sharpbill
Order: PasseriformesFamily: Oxyruncidae

The sharpbill is a small bird of dense forests in Central and South America. It feeds mostly on fruit but also eats insects.

Sharpbill, Oxyruncus cristatus

Royal flycatchers
Order: PasseriformesFamily: Onychorhynchidae

In 2019 the SACC determined that these species, which were formerly considered tyrant flycatchers, belonged in their own family.

Royal flycatcher, Onychorhynchus coronatus
Ruddy-tailed flycatcher, Terenotriccus erythrurus
Sulphur-rumped flycatcher, Myiobius barbatus

Tyrant flycatchers
Order: PasseriformesFamily: Tyrannidae

Tyrant flycatchers are passerine birds which occur throughout North and South America. They superficially resemble the Old World flycatchers, but are more robust and have stronger bills. They do not have the sophisticated vocal capabilities of the songbirds. Most, but not all, have plain coloring. As the name implies, most are insectivorous. Eighty-three species have been recorded in French Guiana.

Tyrant flycatchers are passerine birds which occur throughout North and South America. They superficially resemble the Old World flycatchers, but are more robust and have stronger bills. They do not have the sophisticated vocal capabilities of the songbirds. Most, but not all, have plain coloring. As the name implies, most are insectivorous. Eighty-one species have been recorded in French Guiana.

Wing-barred piprites, Piprites chloris
Cinnamon manakin-tyrant, Neopipo cinnamomea
Cinnamon-crested spadebill, Platyrinchus saturatus
Golden-crowned spadebill, Platyrinchus coronatus
White-crested spadebill, Platyrinchus platyrhynchos
Ringed antpipit, Corythopis torquatus
Olive-green tyrannulet, Phylloscartes virescens
Ochre-bellied flycatcher, Mionectes oleagineus
McConnell's flycatcher, Mionectes macconnelli
Sepia-capped flycatcher, Leptopogon amaurocephalus
Olivaceous flatbill, Rhynchocyclus olivaceus
Yellow-olive flycatcher, Tolmomyias sulphurescens
Yellow-margined flycatcher, Tolmomyias assimilis
Gray-crowned flycatcher, Tolmomyias poliocephalus
Yellow-breasted flycatcher, Tolmomyias flaviventris
Short-tailed pygmy-tyrant, Myiornis ecaudatus
Double-banded pygmy-tyrant, Lophotriccus vitiosus
Helmeted pygmy-tyrant, Lophotriccus galeatus
Boat-billed tody-tyrant, Hemitriccus josephinae
White-eyed tody-tyrant, Hemitriccus zosterops
Smoky-fronted tody-flycatcher, Poecilotriccus fumifrons
Spotted tody-flycatcher, Todirostrum maculatum
Common tody-flycatcher, Todirostrum cinereum
Painted tody-flycatcher, Todirostrum pictum
Cliff flycatcher, Hirundinea ferruginea
Guianan tyrannulet, Zimmerius acer
Pale-tipped tyrannulet, Inezia caudata
White-lored tyrannulet, Ornithion inerme
Southern beardless-tyrannulet, Camptostoma obsoletum
Yellow-bellied elaenia, Elaenia flavogaster
Small-billed elaenia, Elaenia parvirostris
Plain-crested elaenia, Elaenia cristata
Lesser elaenia, Elaenia chiriquensis
Rufous-crowned elaenia, Elaenia ruficeps
Yellow-crowned tyrannulet, Tyrannulus elatus
Forest elaenia, Myiopagis gaimardii
Gray elaenia, Myiopagis caniceps
Yellow-crowned elaenia, Myiopagis flavivertex
Yellow tyrannulet, Capsiempis flaveola
Sooty-headed tyrannulet, Phyllomyias griseiceps
Mouse-colored tyrannulet, Phaeomyias murina
Bearded tachuri, Polystictus pectoralis
Crested doradito, Pseudocolopteryx sclateri (H) — French Guiana's rarities committee (Le Comité d’Homologation de Guyane) has accepted a record of this species.
Cinnamon attila, Attila cinnamomeus
Bright-rumped attila, Attila spadiceus
Piratic flycatcher, Legatus leucophaius
Rufous-tailed flatbill, Ramphotrigon ruficauda
Great kiskadee, Pitangus sulphuratus
Lesser kiskadee, Philohydor lictor
Sulphury flycatcher, Tyrannopsis sulphurea
Boat-billed flycatcher, Megarynchus pitangua
Streaked flycatcher, Myiodynastes maculatus
Rusty-margined flycatcher, Myiozetetes cayanensis
Social flycatcher, Myiozetetes similis
Dusky-chested flycatcher, Myiozetetes luteiventris
Yellow-throated flycatcher, Conopias parvus
Variegated flycatcher, Empidonomus varius
Crowned slaty flycatcher, Empidonomus aurantioatrocristatus (V)
White-throated kingbird, Tyrannus albogularis (V)
Tropical kingbird, Tyrannus melancholicus
Fork-tailed flycatcher, Tyrannus savana
Eastern kingbird, Tyrannus tyrannus (V)
Gray kingbird, Tyrannus dominicensis
Grayish mourner, Rhytipterna simplex
Pale-bellied mourner, Rhytipterna immunda (H)
Todd's sirystes, Sirystes subcanescens
Dusky-capped flycatcher, Myiarchus tuberculifer
Short-crested flycatcher, Myiarchus ferox
Brown-crested flycatcher, Myiarchus tyrannulus
Long-tailed tyrant, Colonia colonus
Bran-colored flycatcher, Myiophobus fasciatus
Northern scrub-flycatcher, Sublegatus arenarum
Amazonian scrub-flycatcher, Sublegatus obscurior
Pied water-tyrant, Fluvicola pica
White-headed marsh tyrant, Arundinicola leucocephala
Fuscous flycatcher, Cnemotriccus fuscatus
Euler's flycatcher, Lathrotriccus euleri
Olive-sided flycatcher, Contopus cooperi
Western wood-pewee, Contopus sordidulus (V)
Tropical pewee, Contopus cinereus (H)
White-throated pewee, Contopus albogularis

Vireos
Order: PasseriformesFamily: Vireonidae

The vireos are a group of small to medium-sized passerine birds. They are typically greenish in color and resemble wood warblers apart from their heavier bills. Nine species have been recorded in French Guiana.

Rufous-browed peppershrike, Cyclarhis gujanensis
Ashy-headed greenlet, Hylophilus pectoralis
Gray-chested greenlet, Hylophilus semicinereus
Lemon-chested greenlet, Hylophilus thoracicus
Slaty-capped shrike-vireo, Vireolanius leucotis
Tawny-crowned greenlet, Tunchiornis ochraceiceps
Buff-cheeked greenlet, Pachysylvia muscicapina
Red-eyed vireo, Vireo olivaceus (?)
Chivi vireo, Vireo chivi
Black-whiskered vireo, Vireo altiloquus (V)

Jays
Order: PasseriformesFamily: Corvidae

The family Corvidae includes crows, ravens, jays, choughs, magpies, treepies, nutcrackers, and ground jays. Corvids are above average in size among the Passeriformes, and some of the larger species show high levels of intelligence. One species has been recorded in French Guiana.

Cayenne jay, Cyanocorax cayanus

Swallows
Order: PasseriformesFamily: Hirundinidae

The family Hirundinidae is adapted to aerial feeding. They have a slender streamlined body, long pointed wings, and a short bill with a wide gape. The feet are adapted to perching rather than walking, and the front toes are partially joined at the base. Fourteen species have been recorded in French Guiana.

Blue-and-white swallow, Pygochelidon  cyanoleuca (V)
Black-collared swallow, Pygochelidon  melanoleuca
White-banded swallow, Atticora fasciata
White-thighed swallow, Atticora tibialis
Southern rough-winged swallow, Stelgidopteryx ruficollis
Brown-chested martin, Progne tapera
Purple martin, Progne subis (H) — French Guiana's rarities committee (Le Comité d’Homologation de Guyane) has accepted a record of this species.
Caribbean martin, Progne dominicensis (H) — French Guiana's rarities committee (Le Comité d’Homologation de Guyane) has accepted a record of this species.
Gray-breasted martin, Progne chalybea
Southern martin, Progne elegans
White-winged swallow, Tachycineta albiventer
Bank swallow, Riparia riparia (H)
Barn swallow, Hirundo rustica
Cliff swallow, Petrochelidon pyrrhonota (H)

Wrens
Order: PasseriformesFamily: Troglodytidae

The wrens are mainly small and inconspicuous except for their loud songs. These birds have short wings and thin down-turned bills. Several species often hold their tails upright. All are insectivorous. Six species have been recorded in French Guiana.

Wing-banded wren, Microcerculus bambla
House wren, Troglodytes aedon
Coraya wren, Pheugopedius coraya
Buff-breasted wren, Cantorchilus leucotis
White-breasted wood-wren, Henicorhina leucosticta
Musician wren, Cyphorhinus arada

Gnatcatchers
Order: PasseriformesFamily: Polioptilidae

These dainty birds resemble Old World warblers in their build and habits, moving restlessly through the foliage seeking insects. The gnatcatchers and gnatwrens are mainly soft bluish gray in color and have the typical insectivore's long sharp bill. They are birds of fairly open woodland or scrub, which nest in bushes or trees. Four species have been recorded in French Guiana.

Collared gnatwren, Microbates collaris
Trilling gnatwren, Ramphocaenus melanurus
Tropical gnatcatcher, Polioptila plumbea
Guianan gnatcatcher, Polioptila guianensis

Donacobius
Order: PasseriformesFamily: Donacobiidae

The black-capped donacobius is found in wet habitats from Panama across northern South America and east of the Andes to Argentina and Paraguay.

Black-capped donacobius, Donacobius atricapilla

Thrushes
Order: PasseriformesFamily: Turdidae

The thrushes are a group of passerine birds that occur mainly in the Old World. They are plump, soft plumaged, small to medium-sized insectivores or sometimes omnivores, often feeding on the ground. Many have attractive songs. Four species have been recorded in French Guiana.

Pale-breasted thrush, Turdus leucomelas
Cocoa thrush, Turdus fumigatus
Spectacled thrush, Turdus nudigenis
White-necked thrush, Turdus albicollis

Old World flycatchers
Order: PasseriformesFamily: Muscicapidae

The Old World flycatchers form a large family of small passerine birds. These are mainly small arboreal insectivores, many of which, as the name implies, take their prey on the wing.

Northern wheatear, Oenanthe oenanthe (V)

Mockingbirds
Order: PasseriformesFamily: Mimidae

The mimids are a family of passerine birds that includes thrashers, mockingbirds, tremblers, and the New World catbirds. These birds are notable for their vocalizations, especially their ability to mimic a wide variety of birds and other sounds heard outdoors. Their coloring tends towards dull, grays and brown. One species has been recorded in French Guiana.

Tropical mockingbird, Mimus gilvus

Old World sparrows
Order: PasseriformesFamily: Passeridae

Sparrows are small passerine birds. In general, sparrows tend to be small, plump, brown or gray birds with short tails and short powerful beaks. Sparrows are seed eaters, but they also consume small insects. One species has been recorded in French Guiana.

House sparrow, Passer domesticus (I)

Pipits and wagtails
Order: PasseriformesFamily: Motacillidae

Motacillidae is a family of small passerine birds with medium to long tails. They include the wagtails, longclaws, and pipits. They are slender, ground feeding insectivores of open country. Two species have been recorded in French Guiana.

White wagtail, Motacilla alba (V)
Yellowish pipit, Anthus chii

Finches
Order: PasseriformesFamily: Fringillidae

Finches are seed-eating passerine birds, that are small to moderately large and have a strong beak, usually conical and in some species very large. All have twelve tail feathers and nine primaries. These birds have a bouncing flight with alternating bouts of flapping and gliding on closed wings, and most sing well. Seven species have been recorded in French Guiana.

Golden-rumped euphonia, Chlorophonia cyanocephala
Plumbeous euphonia, Euphonia plumbea
Finsch's euphonia, Euphonia finschi
Golden-bellied euphonia, Euphonia chrysopasta
White-vented euphonia, Euphonia minuta
Violaceous euphonia, Euphonia violacea
Golden-sided euphonia, Euphonia cayennensis

Sparrows
Order: PasseriformesFamily: Passerellidae

Most of the species are known as sparrows, but these birds are not closely related to the Old World sparrows which are in the family Passeridae. Many of these have distinctive head patterns. Three species have been recorded in French Guiana.

Grassland sparrow, Ammodramus humeralis
Pectoral sparrow, Arremon taciturnus
Rufous-collared sparrow, Zonotrichia capensis

Blackbirds
Order: PasseriformesFamily: Icteridae

The icterids are a group of small to medium-sized, often colorful, passerine birds restricted to the New World and include the grackles, New World blackbirds and New World orioles. Most species have black as the predominant plumage color, often enlivened by yellow, orange, or red. Fourteen species have been recorded in French Guiana.

Bobolink, Dolichonyx oryzivorus
Eastern meadowlark, Sturnella magna
Red-breasted meadowlark, Leistes militaris
Green oropendola, Psarocolius viridis
Crested oropendola, Psarocolius decumanus
Yellow-rumped cacique, Cacicus cela
Red-rumped cacique, Cacicus haemorrhous
Epaulet oriole, Icterus cayanensis'
Baltimore oriole, Icterus galbula (V)
Yellow oriole, Icterus nigrogularisGiant cowbird, Molothrus oryzivorusShiny cowbird, Molothrus bonariensisCarib grackle, Quiscalus lugubrisYellow-hooded blackbird, Chrysomus icterocephalusWood-warblers
Order: PasseriformesFamily: Parulidae

The wood-warblers are a group of small, often colorful, passerine birds restricted to the New World. Most are arboreal, but some are terrestrial. Most members of this family are insectivores. 
Nine species have been recorded in French Guiana.

Northern waterthrush, Parkesia noveboracensisProthonotary warbler, Protonotaria citreaMasked yellowthroat, Geothlypis aequinoctialisAmerican redstart, Setophaga ruticillaTropical parula, Setophaga pitiayumiBlackburnian warbler, Setophaga fuscaYellow warbler, Setophaga petechiaBlackpoll warbler, Setophaga striataRiverbank warbler, Myiothlypis rivularisMitrospingids
Order: PasseriformesFamily: Mitrospingidae

Until 2017 the four species in this family were included in the family Thraupidae, the "true" tanagers.

Red-billed pied tanager, Lamprospiza melanoleuca 

Cardinal grosbeaks
Order: PasseriformesFamily: Cardinalidae

The cardinals are a family of robust, seed-eating birds with strong bills. They are typically associated with open woodland. The sexes usually have distinct plumages. Nine species have been recorded in French Guiana.

Hepatic tanager, Piranga flavaSummer tanager, Piranga rubraScarlet tanager, Piranga olivacea (V)
Rose-breasted grosbeak, Pheucticus ludovicianus (H) — French Guiana's rarities committee (Le Comité d’Homologation de Guyane) has accepted four records of this species.
Rose-breasted chat, Granatellus pelzelniYellow-green grosbeak, Caryothraustes canadensisRed-and-black grosbeak, Periporphyrus erythromelasAmazonian grosbeak, Cyanoloxia rothschildiiDickcissel, Spiza americana (V)

Tanagers
Order: PasseriformesFamily: Thraupidae

The tanagers are a large group of small to medium-sized passerine birds restricted to the New World, mainly in the tropics. As a family they are omnivorous, but individual species specialize in eating fruits, seeds, insects, or other types of food. Most have short, rounded wings. Fifty species have been recorded in French Guiana.

Blue-backed tanager, Cyanicterus cyanicterusHooded tanager, Nemosia pileataGreen honeycreeper, Chlorophanes spizaGuira tanager, Hemithraupis guiraYellow-backed tanager, Hemithraupis flavicollisBicolored conebill, Conirostrum bicolorChestnut-vented conebill, Conirostrum speciosumBlue-black grassquit, Volatinia jacarinaBlack-and-white tanager, Conothraupis speculigera (V)
Flame-crested tanager, Loriotus cristatusWhite-shouldered tanager, Loriotus luctuosusFulvous-crested tanager, Tachyphonus surinamusWhite-shouldered tanager, Tachyphonus luctuosusWhite-lined tanager, Tachyphonus rufusRed-shouldered tanager, Tachyphonus phoeniciusPileated finch, Coryphospingus pileatus (H)
Silver-beaked tanager, Ramphocelus carboFulvous shrike-tanager, Lanio fulvusPurple honeycreeper, Cyanerpes caeruleusRed-legged honeycreeper, Cyanerpes cyaneusSwallow tanager, Tersina viridisBlack-faced dacnis, Dacnis lineataBlue dacnis, Dacnis cayanaLesson's seedeater, Sporophila bouvronidesLined seedeater, Sporophila lineolaChestnut-bellied seedeater, Sporophila castaneiventrisRuddy-breasted seedeater, Sporophila minutaChestnut-bellied seed-finch, Sporophila angolensisLarge-billed seed-finch, Sporophila crassirostrisWing-barred seedeater, Sporophila americanaYellow-bellied seedeater, Sporophila nigricollisSlate-colored seedeater, Sporophila schistacea (H)
Plumbeous seedeater, Sporophila plumbeaBuff-throated saltator, Saltator maximusOlive-gray saltator, Saltator olivascensSlate-colored grosbeak, Saltator grossusWedge-tailed grass-finch, Emberizoides herbicolaBananaquit, Coereba flaveolaRed-capped cardinal, Paroaria gularis (H) — French Guiana's rarities committee (Le Comité d’Homologation de Guyane) has accepted five records of this species. 
Black-faced tanager, Schistochlamys melanopisBurnished-buff tanager, Stilpnia cayanaTurquoise tanager, Tangara mexicanaParadise tanager, Tangara chilensisOpal-rumped tanager, Tangara veliaBay-headed tanager, Tangara gyrolaBlue-gray tanager, Thraupis episcopusPalm tanager, Thraupis palmarumDotted tanager, Ixothraupis varia (H) — French Guiana's rarities committee (Le Comité d’Homologation de Guyane) has accepted several records of this species. 
Speckled tanager, Ixothraupis guttata (H)  — French Guiana's rarities committee (Le Comité d’Homologation de Guyane) has accepted three records of this species. 
Spotted tanager, Ixothraupis punctata''

Notes

References

See also
List of birds
Lists of birds by region

French Guiana
'
birds